This article displays the qualifying draw of the 2011 Abierto Mexicano Telcel.

Players

Seeds

  Anna Tatishvili (qualifier)
  Lesia Tsurenko (qualifier)
  Olivia Sanchez (first round)
  Irina Falconi (first round)
  Han Xinyun (first round)
  Mandy Minella (first round)
  Petra Cetkovská (qualifying competition)
  Irina-Camelia Begu (qualifying competition)

Qualifiers

  Anna Tatishvili
  Lesia Tsurenko
  Silvia Soler Espinosa
  Mădălina Gojnea

Qualifying draw

First qualifier

Second qualifier

Third qualifier

Fourth qualifier

References
 Qualifying Draw

2011 Abierto Mexicano Telcel
Abierto Mexicano Telcel - qualifying
Qualification for tennis tournaments